The women's 1000 metres race of the 2015–16 ISU Speed Skating World Cup 1, arranged in the Olympic Oval, in Calgary, Alberta, Canada, was held on 14 November 2015.

Heather Richardson-Bergsma of the United States won the race on a new world record, while compatriot and previous world record holder Brittany Bowe came second, also beating the old record, and Zhang Hong of China came third. Li Qishi of China won the Division B race.

Results
The race took place on Saturday, 14 November, with Division B scheduled in the morning session, at 09:30, and Division A scheduled in the afternoon session, at 12:30.

Division A

Note: WR = world record, NR = national record.

Division B

Note: NR = national record.

References

Women 1000
1